The 1911 Central Michigan Normalites football team represented Central Michigan Normal School, later renamed Central Michigan University, as an independent during the 1911 college football season. In their third season under head coach Harry Helmer, the Central Michigan football team compiled a 3–3 record and were outscored by their opponents by a combined total of 29 to 26. The team won its first three games, all against high school teams, and lost its final three games against the Michigan School for the Deaf (0-6), Ferris State (0-11), and the Michigan Agricultural freshman team (0-6).

Schedule

References

Central Michigan
Central Michigan Chippewas football seasons
Central Michigan Normalites football